Caroline Russell Compton (January 10, 1907 − August 1, 1987) was a noted Mississippi artist.  Her paintings are part of the permanent collection in the Mississippi Museum of Art.

Biography
Caroline Compton was born in Vicksburg, Mississippi, to Thomas Wilbur Compton and Kate Russell Compton. She had two older sisters – Catherine (born 1901) and Mary (born 1902); an older brother – Thomas (born 1904); and a younger brother – Joseph (born 1908).

Education and career
Caroline Compton attended high school at All Saints' Junior College in Vicksburg and began her career as an artist after graduating from Sweet Briar College.  From 1927 to 1929, she attended New York's Grand Central School of Art.

In the 1930s, as part of the Federal Art Project, Caroline Compton traveled the state of Mississippi as an art teacher in public schools and served as state director of the WPA's Mississippi Art Project from 1939 to 1940.

In 1961, Compton organized the Vicksburg Art Association and opened Vicksburg's Firehouse Gallery in 1971.  In her paintings, Compton used the mediums of graphite, watercolor, oils, and woodblocks to capture people, landscapes, houses, public buildings, and riverfront settings in her hometown of Vicksburg.

Death
Caroline Compton died August 1, 1987, and was interred at Cedar Hill Cemetery in Vicksburg, Mississippi.

References

External links

1907 births
1987 deaths
People from Vicksburg, Mississippi
Painters from Mississippi
20th-century American painters
Sweet Briar College alumni
American women painters
People of the New Deal arts projects
Grand Central School of Art alumni
20th-century American women artists